Resurrection is the second studio album by progressive metal band Operation: Mindcrime. It is the second in a concept album trilogy on virtual currencies, internet banking and stock trading. It was released on September 23, 2016. The first single, titled "Taking On The World" was released in September 2016, and a video was filmed with the song's guests, Blaze Bayley and Tim "Ripper" Owens.

Track listing

References

2016 albums
Operation: Mindcrime (band) albums
Frontiers Records albums
Concept albums